Greater Port Harcourt City Development Authority (GPHCDA) is an agency of the Government of Rivers State, the second largest economy in Nigeria. It was formed under Law No. 2 of 2009 on Greater Port Harcourt City Development Authority. It is entrusted with facilitating the execution of the master plan for Greater Port Harcourt. It also has the responsibility to develop the area by putting into practical effect policy measures aimed at promoting and providing effective infrastructures and social services.

Composition
The Authority Membership is composed of a part-time chairman, an administrator, six qualified professionals in the field of estate management, surveying, engineering, urban planning, architecture, quantity surveying, building and law. It also includes representatives of the ministries of Justice, Land Survey, Urban Development, Works, Environment and two persons representing NGOs and other stakeholders.

Current board members
The current board members, as of June 2016 are:
 Ferdinand Alabraba, Chairman
 Desmond Akawor, Administrator
 John Synger, Secretary 
 Florence Amiesimaka, Member
 Chima Boms, Member
 Emma Okas Wike, Member
 Gloria Akor, Member 
 Tonte J. Davies, Member
 Nnamdi Obuzor, Member
 Emmanuel C. Aguma, Member
 Emmanuel Okah, Member
 Harrison B. Iheanyichukwu, Member
 Chinyere Igwe, Member
 Roseline Konya, Member
 Lands and Survey commissioner, Member

See also
 Rivers State Ministry of Urban Development
 List of government agencies of Rivers State

References

External links

Government agencies and parastatals of Rivers State
Government agencies established in 2009
Urban development
Organizations based in Port Harcourt
2009 establishments in Nigeria
2000s establishments in Rivers State